Frozencamp is an unincorporated community in Jackson County, West Virginia, United States.

References

Unincorporated communities in Jackson County, West Virginia
Unincorporated communities in West Virginia